Devizes is a ghost town in Norton County, Kansas, United States.

History
Devizes was issued a post office in 1874. The post office was discontinued in 1926.

References

Former populated places in Norton County, Kansas
Former populated places in Kansas